Tümendembereliin Züünbayan (born 20 January 1974) is a Mongolian wrestler. He competed in the men's freestyle 54 kg at the 2000 Summer Olympics.

References

 

1974 births
Living people
Mongolian male sport wrestlers
Olympic wrestlers of Mongolia
Wrestlers at the 2000 Summer Olympics
Place of birth missing (living people)
Asian Games medalists in wrestling
Wrestlers at the 1994 Asian Games
Wrestlers at the 1998 Asian Games
Medalists at the 1994 Asian Games
Asian Games silver medalists for Mongolia
Asian Wrestling Championships medalists
21st-century Mongolian people
20th-century Mongolian people